Helena is an unincorporated community in southeastern Andrew County, Missouri, United States. It is located approximately twelve miles northeast of St. Joseph and is part of the St. Joseph, MO–KS Metropolitan Statistical Area.

Helena has a park, an elementary school, two churches, a community center and a post office.

History
Helena was laid out in 1878. According to tradition, the community has the name of the daughter of a railroad man. A post office called Helena has been in operation since 1880.

References

Unincorporated communities in Andrew County, Missouri
St. Joseph, Missouri metropolitan area
Unincorporated communities in Missouri